

Events
 January 4–6: the annual American Philosophical Association Eastern Division meeting in Montreal, Quebec.
 April 5-8: the annual American Philosophical Association Pacific Division meeting in San Francisco.

References

2023-related lists
Philosophy by year
21st-century philosophy